Penicillium cluniae is a fungus species of the genus of Penicillium which produces the antinematodal and antiparasitic agents paraherquamide B, paraherquamide C, paraherquamide D, paraherquamide E, paraherquamide F, paraherquamide G, paraherquamide H

See also
List of Penicillium species

References

cluniae
Fungi described in 1990